Hall Lucien Davis (born March 2, 1987) is a former American football defensive end. He was drafted by the St. Louis Rams in the fifth round of the 2010 NFL Draft.

He has also been a member of the Washington Redskins, Tennessee Titans, Oakland Raiders, Cleveland Browns, Dallas Cowboys and Pittsburgh Steelers.

Early years
Davis was an All-District 8-2A selection with 20 receptions at wide receiver in addition to playing defensive end and safety at University High School. He finished his senior season with 10 quarterback sacks and over 100 tackles

College career
Davis was a two-year starter saw action in five seasons as he was granted a medical redshirt after suffering an early-season injury as a freshman. He earned honorable mention All-Sun Belt as a senior. He recorded 6.5 sacks and 11 tackles for loss during final two seasons with the Cajuns.

As a senior in 2009 Daivs started all 12 games at defensive end and tied for the team lead in sacks and ranked 16th in the Sun Belt Conference in that category. He finished with 22 tackles, 4.5 for losses and three sacks. The previous season, as a junior, he started all 12 games at defensive end and finished second among defensive lineman in tackles and tackles-for-loss. He led the defensive line in sacks with 3.5 sacks and totaled 24 tackles, five for loss.

As a sophomore in 2007 he played in all 12 games at defensive end and made 11 tackles (1.5 for losses) and as a freshman he played in all 12 games on the defensive line, starting the first two games and recording two tackles.  He was a redshirt freshman in 2005 after suffering an ankle injury.

Professional career

St. Louis Rams
Davis was drafted on the 5th round by the St. Louis Rams. On June 28, 2010, Davis signed a four-year, $1.979 million contract with the Rams. The deal included a $188,881 signing bonus. In the three preseason games Davis played for the Rams in 2010, he had two tackles and two sacks. The two sacks tied for the team lead with Ram veteran defensive tackle Fred Robbins.

Washington Redskins
Davis was traded to the Washington Redskins on August 30, 2010, for an undisclosed conditional draft pick. The following day, August 31, 2010, he was released by the Redskins.

Tennessee Titans
On September 5, 2010, Davis was signed to the Tennessee Titans practice squad. He was released on September 2, 2011.

Oakland Raiders
On January 6, 2012, he signed a future/reserve contract with the Oakland Raiders.

Denver Broncos
Davis was signed to the practice squad of the Denver Broncos on January 7, 2014.

References

External links

Louisiana Bio
St. Louis Rams Bio

1987 births
Living people
American football defensive ends
Cleveland Browns players
Louisiana Ragin' Cajuns football players
Players of American football from Baton Rouge, Louisiana
St. Louis Rams players
Tennessee Titans players